Victoria  was a passenger and freight sternwheeler that was built for service on the Soda Creek to Quesnel route on the upper Fraser River in British Columbia. 
She was built at Quesnel by pioneer shipbuilder James Trahey of Victoria for Gustavus Blin-Wright and Captain Thomas Wright and was put into service in the spring of 1869 to augment the service of  also built by Trahey for the Wrights. Although the Victorias hull was new, her engines and boiler had originally been in the Prince of Wales from Lillooet Lake. 

The Victoria was the second of twelve sternwheelers that would work on this section of the Fraser River. She was larger than the Enterprise and more powerful. The two steamers worked together for only three years, when in 1871, the Enterprise was taken up to Takla Landing and abandoned on Trembleur Lake. The Victoria would work alone on the Soda Creek to Quesnel route for fifteen more years until 1886.

The route
The Fraser River was not considered navigable by sternwheeler between Yale and Soda Creek due to many hazardous canyons and rapids. The last obstacle to navigation was just downriver from Soda Creek, the Soda Creek Canyon, so the terminus of river navigation on the upper Fraser River was located at Soda Creek. From there a steamer could travel with no obstructions to Quesnel where a stage road ran to Barkerville. Passengers and freight would then be transferred onto the sternwheeler and travel upriver  to Quesnel. Once there they would be transferred to company stages again to Barkerville for the last . Victoria made this trip three times a week, from May to October, from 1869 until 1886. She would be taken out of the river and berthed at Steamboat Landing near Alexandria in the fall of 1886. With her departure the upper Fraser River would be without steamer service until 1906.

See also
 Steamboats of the Upper Fraser River in British Columbia
 List of ships in British Columbia

Notes

References and further reading
 
 
 

Paddle steamers of British Columbia
1869 ships